West Brow is an unincorporated community and census-designated place (CDP) on the eastern side of Dade County, Georgia, United States. It is on top of Lookout Mountain, along Georgia State Route 189, which leads northeast  to the city of Lookout Mountain.

West Brow was first listed as a CDP prior to the 2020 census with a population of 887.

Demographics

2020 census

Note: the US Census treats Hispanic/Latino as an ethnic category. This table excludes Latinos from the racial categories and assigns them to a separate category. Hispanics/Latinos can be of any race.

References 

Census-designated places in Dade County, Georgia